Flanders War may refer to:
 War of the Succession of Flanders and Hainault (1240s)
 Battle of the Golden Spurs (1302)
 Dutch Revolt (1568–1648)